Jagdalpur Airport , also known as Maa Danteswari Airport, is a regional airport located near Jagdalpur, in the state of Chhattisgarh, India. The Airports Authority of India (AAI) conducted a pre-feasibility study in July 2013 for development of the airport and approved of operations of  aircraft under Visual Flight Rules (VFR) conditions. The airport was chosen for an upgrade under the Government's UDAN scheme and the ground breaking ceremony for the construction of a terminal building was performed in January 2017.
The airfield was upgraded to 3C category in 2019, allowing the operations of ATR-72 type of aircraft. On 21 September 2020, Alliance Air started flights to Hyderabad and Raipur using an ATR-72 aircraft. Currently, Jagdalpur airport name changed to Maa Danteshwari Airport on 21 September 2020.

The district administration has floated a proposal to set up a new airport for Jagdalpur in Ulnar village of Bastar district. This airport is expected to be set up in an area measuring 250 hectares. It would have a 3 km long and 200 metres wide runway. The airport would also boast of a state of the art airport terminal building. Since about 92% (229 hectares) of the land required is owned by the government, the land acquisition process is expected to be quick leading to a faster development time for the airport.

Airlines and destinations

See also
 Swami Vivekananda Airport, Raipur
 Bilasa Devi Kevat Airport, Bilaspur
 List of airports in India
 List of the busiest airports in India

References

External links

Airports in Chhattisgarh
Airports with year of establishment missing
Transport in Jagdalpur